Pasaman Regency is a regency (kabupaten) of West Sumatra, Indonesia. The regency seat is the town of Lubuk Sikaping.

Pasaman is located in the north-east of West Sumatra. The town of Bonjol, birthplace of Tuanku Imam Bonjol, is notable for being the area where the Trans-Sumatran Highway crosses the equator. Although the majority tribe in West Sumatra is Minangkabau, in Pasaman there is another big tribe, the Mandailing from North Sumatra, so Pasaman means "equality" between two tribes in the Minangkabau language (Indonesian: Persamaan). The first Vice-Regent of Pasaman was H. Ahmad Dahlan Nasution from Duo Koto, King of Sontang (kingdom of Mandailing in Pasaman).

Administrative districts

Pasaman Regency is divided into twelve districts (kecamatan), listed below with their areas and their populations at the 2010 Census and the 2020 Census. The table also includes the location of the district administrative centres, and the number of administrative villages (rural desa and urban kelurahan) in each district.

References

regencies of West Sumatra